Grace Min was the defending champion, but chose to participate at the US Open Qualifying instead.

Linda Nosková won the title, defeating Alexandra Ignatik in the final, 6–7(2–7), 6–4, 6–3.

Seeds

Draw

Finals

Top half

Bottom half

References

Main Draw

Zubr Cup - Singles